Francis Crossing (1598–1638) of Exeter, Devon, was an English politician who sat in the House of Commons from 1626 to 1629.

Crossing was the son of Hugh Crossing, Mayor of Exeter, by his wife Joane Barret, daughter of John Barret of Barnstaple, Devon. He matriculated at Balliol College, Oxford on 11 May 1615 aged 16. In 1626 he was elected Member of Parliament for  Mitchell, Cornwall. He was elected MP for Camelford, Cornwall, in 1628 and sat until 1629 when King Charles I commenced his Personal Rule for eleven years.

Further reading
History of Parliament biography of Crossing, Francis (c.1598-1638), of Exeter, Devon

References

1598 births
1638 deaths
Members of the pre-1707 English Parliament for constituencies in Cornwall
Alumni of Balliol College, Oxford
English MPs 1626
English MPs 1628–1629